The Assumburg, also known as Het Huis Assenburg (English: The House Assenburg), is a windmill located on the Veerweg 1 in Nieuw-Vossemeer, Steenbergen, in the province of North Brabant, Netherlands. Built in 1780 in The Zaan district, the windmill functioned as oil mill, until it was moved to its current location in 1897, when it became a gristmill. The mill was built as a tower mill with a bottom support of 5.20 meters high, and its sails have a span of 22.20 meters. The mill is a national monument (nr 30611) since 15 May 1973.

Gallery of images

References 

Windmills in North Brabant
Rijksmonuments in North Brabant
Smock mills in the Netherlands
Grinding mills in the Netherlands
Windmills completed in 1897
Steenbergen